A professional association (also called  a professional body, professional organization, or professional society) is a group that usually seeks to further a particular profession, the interests of individuals and organisations engaged in that profession, and the public interest. In the United States, such an association is typically a nonprofit business league for tax purposes. In the UK, they may take a variety of legal forms.

Roles
The roles of professional associations have been variously defined: "A group, of people in a learned occupation who are entrusted with maintaining control or oversight of the legitimate practice of the occupation;" also a body acting "to safeguard the public interest;" organizations which "represent the interest of the professional practitioners," and so "act to maintain their own privileged and powerful position as a controlling body." Professional associations are ill defined although often have commonality in purpose and activities. In the UK, the Science Council defines a professional body as "an organisation with individual members practicing a profession or occupation in which the organisation maintains an oversight of the knowledge, skills, conduct and practice of that profession or occupation". The Quality Assurance Agency distinguishes between statutory bodies and regulators that "have powers mandated by Parliament to regulate a profession or group of professions and protect the use of professional titles" and professional bodies that "are independent membership organisations that oversee the activities of a particular profession and represent the interests of [their] members" and which "may offer registration or certification of unregulated occupations on a voluntary basis."

Most professional organizations of global scope (see List of international professional associations) are located in the United States.  The USA has often led the transformation of various occupations into professions, a process described in the academic literature as professionalization.

Many professional bodies are involved in accrediting degrees, defining and examining the skills and competencies necessary to practice a person, and granting professional certifications to indicate that a person is qualified in the subject area. Sometimes membership of a professional body is synonymous with certification, though not always. Membership of a professional body, as a legal requirement, can in some professions form the primary formal basis for gaining entry to and setting up practice within the profession; see licensure.

Many professional bodies also act as learned societies for the academic disciplines underlying their professions.

See also 
 Advocacy
 Bar association
 Guild
 Regulatory college
 Inter-professional association
 List of international professional associations
 Learned society
 Syndicate
 Trade association
 Trade union
 Working group

References

External links 
 List of Professional bodies in the United Kingdom
 List of Professional bodies in Australia
  List of Professional bodies in Canada
 Anders Kjellberg Union density and specialist/professional unions in Sweden, Lund University: Studies in Social Policy, Industrial Relations, Working Life and Mobility. Research Reports 2013:2

 
Types of organization